The 1965 Long Beach State 49ers football team represented California State College, Long Beach—now known as California State University, Long Beach—as a member of the California Collegiate Athletic Association (CCAA) during the 1965 NCAA College Division football season. Led by eighth-year head coach Don Reed, the 49ers compiled an overall record of 9–1 with a mark of 4–1 in conference play, placing second in the CCAA. Long Beach State entered the AP small college poll rankings after an upset of No. 3 San Diego State on October 9. The 49ers were ranked as high as No. 5, but dropped to No. 9 after a loss to Cal State Los Angeles on November 13 and then fell out of the final rankings despite a win over the Pacific Tigers in the season finale. The team played home games at Veterans Memorial Stadium adjacent to the campus of Long Beach City College in Long Beach, California.

Schedule

Team players in the NFL
The following were selected in the 1966 NFL Draft.

Notes

References

Long Beach State
Long Beach State 49ers football seasons
Long Beach State 49ers football